The Senate Athletic League is an OHSAA-sponsored athletic league that is entirely made up of schools located within Cleveland, Ohio.

Members

Former members

References

Senate Athletic League Official Site

Ohio high school sports conferences
Sports in Cleveland